Henry or Harry Parkinson may refer to:
 Henry Parkinson (footballer, born 1899) (1899–1994), English footballer for Brentford and Oldham Athletic
 Henry Parkinson (footballer, born 1864) (1864–1941), also known as Harry, English footballer for Everton and Accrington
 Henry Parkinson (railway engineer), railway engineer in Australia and New Zealand
 H. B. Parkinson (Henry Broughton Parkinson), British film producer and director
 Harry Parkinson (cricketer), Australian cricketer
 George Henry Radcliffe Parkinson, also known as Harry, British philosopher and historian of philosophy